Fern Creek High School is a communications, JROTC, media and the arts magnet school in Louisville, Kentucky, United States. It is part of Jefferson County Public Schools. Founded in 1923, it was the first high school in the Jefferson County (Kentucky) School System. It has an enrollment of approximately 1,900 students.

History
On 30th September 2014, at least one shot was fired at the school. One student with non-life-threatening injuries was transported to a local hospital. The high school and a nearby elementary school were placed on lock-down while authorities searched for the gunman. A suspect described as a student was apprehended nearby about three hours after the shooting.

Academics

FCTHS provides an academic program with a variety of majors to meet students' diverse career and college interests.  Students select one of four Schools of Study that best suits their academic or career goals:

 School of Communication and Media
 School of Visual and Performing Arts
 School of Analytical and Applied Sciences
 School of Leadership and Social Science
 United States Marine Corps JROTC (MCJROTC)
 Ivy Plus Academy

Within each School of Study, students choose to participate in one of the following tracks: the comprehensive, honors, or advanced program. Each program is geared toward students' success after graduating from FCTHS.

Comprehensive Traditional Program
The Comprehensive Traditional Program is a high-standards curriculum that follows Kentucky Core Content. All students have the opportunity to gain skills to prepare them college or other opportunities after high school.

Honors Program
The Honors Program incorporates a more challenging college-preparation sequence with extensive reading and writing activities. Students must maintain a 2.75 grade point average (GPA) on a 4.0 scale to remain in the program.

Advanced Program
For gifted and highly motivated students, Fern Creek offers an Advanced Program curriculum that provides even more stimulating coursework. Students may choose advance studies in a single class or in multiple classes. This accelerated pre-college curriculum focuses on English, mathematics, science, social studies, and humanities. To participate, students must pass the Advance Program screening test, have a teacher/counselor/parent recommendation, and maintain at least a B average in designated classes. Seniors who complete the pre-college advance program requirements receive an advance-level seal on their diploma upon graduation.

Advanced Placement courses
FCTHS offers several Advanced Placement (AP) courses: English Language, English Literature, Government, Human Geography, Calculus, World History, U.S. History, Art Studio, Physics, and Statistics. Students who take these courses and then score well on the AP tests may receive college credit. FCTHS faculty members are specifically certified to teach Advanced Placement courses.

Marine Corps Junior Reserved Officer Training Corps
The Marine Corps JROTC has won top honors in the country over the past several decades, including the MCROA. The MCROA award is presented to the top JROTC Unit in their perspective region that has shown great acts of leadership, teamwork, and organization within their cadets. The Leatherneck and Lady Leatherneck Drill Teams have also received top honors and titles throughout the years. The Lady Leathernecks won the National High School Drill Team Championships in 1997, and consecutively since 2000. They won their 13th consecutive national title in Daytona Beach, Florida on May 7, 2012. The Leathernecks have won multiple runners-up, and place top five in the nation.

Ivy Plus Academy  
Ivy Plus is an application mandatory program within FC. It connects high achieving students with top colleges throughout the US and even Canada. This year (2018) there are over 20 schools coming in the first half of the year including but not limited to University of Chicago, Wake Forest, and Vanderbilt.  The Ivy Plus Academy's purpose is to ensure students’ acceptance into the nation's most selective colleges and universities. Ivy Plus Academy students will travel as a cohort in their core classes to ensure rigorous academic standards and to maintain the integrity of the Ivy Plus Academy philosophy and purpose. Ivy Plus Academy students will take multiple Advanced Placement and dual-credit classes throughout their time at Fern Creek to maximize potential college credit opportunities. Ivy Plus Academy students will have access to one-on-one college counseling services which include college selection, application assistance, financial aid support and extensive college visits. Ivy Plus Academy students will be prioritized and provided. Academy space is limited and preference is given to students within Fern Creek's resides area. Students who are not accepted into the initial Academy cohort will be placed on the waiting list (Students may still choose to attend Fern Creek and may be enrolled in specific Advanced Placement classes as non Academy participants).  They earned over 6 million dollars in scholarships for the class of 2017.

Athletics

Notable people

Alumni
 Chuck Bradley, American player of gridiron football
 Jamon Brown, professional football player
 Phyllis Burch, professional wrestler
 James R. Ramsey, former president of University of Louisville
 Lee Roberson, Baptist pastor, founder, president, and chancellor of Tennessee Temple University and Temple Baptist Seminary
 Richard Schmidt, college basketball coach
 Mario Urrutia, NFL football player for Cincinnati Bengals, New York Jets, Tampa Bay Buccaneers, Hartford Colonials and Sacramento Mountain Lions

Faculty
John Givens, former basketball coach

See also

 Public schools in Louisville, Kentucky

References

External links
Fern Creek High School website
Fern Creek Tigers Live

Jefferson County Public Schools (Kentucky)
Educational institutions established in 1923
Public high schools in Kentucky
Magnet schools in Kentucky
1923 establishments in Kentucky
High schools in Louisville, Kentucky